Shotley Bridge is a village, adjoining the town of Consett in County Durham, England. It is on the A694 road and beside the River Derwent which is crossed by the bridge giving the name. It was once the heart of Britain's swordmaking industry.

History
There were formerly several fords over the River Derwent near this place and in medieval times a wooden bridge.  The present stone bridge was widened in 1820, but its original date is not known.
The bed of the river itself was the source of stone for millstones, and licences for this are recorded at "Shotley Brig" in 1356. A water-powered corn mill was established in the 14th century, later replaced by a steam-powered one which was sold to the Derwent Co-operative Flour Mill Society Ltd in 1872, and continued until its closure in 1920. A paper mill was established in 1788 (the first in the north of England) and greatly expanded with mechanization so that in 1894 it had 300 hands (half being girls) and was a major factor in the expansion of the village.  However it closed in 1905. A well near the village had unpleasant tasting water rumoured to be effective in curing disease and thus known as the "Hally Well" (hally = healthy, like hale). In 1828 a local entrepreneur John Richardson used this as the basis for a Spa which enjoyed considerable success with the well-to-do, becoming less fashionable as industry grew in nearby towns, but being remade as a playground for workers. It was during the Victorian era that much of the town's architecture was constructed, including some grand residences and many listed buildings, so that by 1898 it had much of its present form. and a population of over 1000. This also saw the advent of Shotley Bridge railway station (closed 1952) and a gasworks which closed in the 1960s, electric lighting having replaced gas lamps from 1950. The closure of the steelworks at Consett in 1980 caused an economic decline, however since then the village has become more popular.

Swordmaking
In the 17th century a group of swordmakers (Oley, Vooz, Molle and Bertram) from Solingen in Germany settled in Shotley Bridge, in order to escape religious persecution. Shotley Bridge was chosen because of the quality of the ironstone in the area and the softness and fast flow of the River Derwent. The Oley family were makers of the highest quality swords, rivalling those of Toledo, by using Damascus steel, in great demand during the Napoleonic Wars. They became very wealthy. Their steel production facility was one of the earliest factories for manufacture of steel. The Oley family were involved in the formation of the Consett Iron Company. New weapons and industrialization reduced demand for swords so they diversified into other types of cutlery, but could not compete with Sheffield, and the sword works closed in 1840.  Some moved to Birmingham and their business eventually became part of Wilkinson Sword.

Evidence of this industry includes grooves in the stones of the river, the fine house inscribed "Cutlers Hall, 1767, William Oley" and the name of the public house "The Crown and Crossed Swords".  Before the last remaining cottages occupied by the swordmakers were demolished, there was an inscription over the door of the Oley house on Wood Street reading "Das Herren segen machet reich ohn alle Sorg wenn Du zugleich in deinem Stand treu und fleissig bist und tuest alle vas die befolen ist". This means "The blessing of the Lord makes rich without care, so long as you are industrious in your vocation and do what is ordered you".

Places of Worship
The first mention of a chapel at Shotley is in 1165. This is the site of the (now disused) Anglican parish church, St Andrew's, Shotley, which is high on a hill above the town.  It is an eighteenth-century Grade II listed building rebuilt in 1892 because of subsidence due to coal workings below. The current parish church is that of St John at Snod's Edge, also Grade II listed, dating from 1837 when it was founded as a chapel outpost of St Andrew's. There is a Roman Catholic Church, Our Lady of the Rosary (1952), and an Anglican Church, St Cuthbert's (1850), designed by John Dobson, in the Benfieldside area south-east of the main town.  The Methodist Church was built in 1894, and closed in 2014.

Shotley Bridge Hospital
Shotley Bridge Hospital originated with the acquisition of the Whinney House Estate in 1912. The site was initially used as a tuberculosis hospital but served as a facility for the care of people with mental problems being known as "Shotley Bridge Mental Defectives Colony" from 1927 to 1940, when it was converted to an Emergency Hospital to cope with the Second World War, particularly providing plastic surgery, becoming a general hospital in 1948. Although it was once one of the largest of the Northern Region services have been transferred elsewhere, most of the buildings demolished for housing and the current hospital is a much smaller group of modern buildings operating as a community hospital.

Other buildings
In the Victorian boom time, the village was often referred to as a town, which such enthusiasm that a Town Hall was actually built in 1860.  It is one of several buildings from this period in Neogothic style.  Another is Shotley Hall by Edward Robson.  There are other grand houses from this period which are some of the many listed buildings in the area.  While the Wesleyan Chapel was demolished, its Sunday School remains and is now the Village Hall.  The clergyman's house is now known as The Manse. The 1876 Temperance Hall is now the Assembly Rooms. The Crown and Crossed Swords hotel includes what was once a separate establishment, The Commercial.

Notable people
Professional footballer Ben Clark was born in Shotley Bridge.
England Test cricketer Paul Collingwood played for Shotley Bridge Cricket Club in his youth.
The Italian poet and writer Avro Manhattan spent his final years in Shotley Bridge, his wife's home town, and is buried there.
England Rugby Union international Mathew Tait was born in Shotley Bridge.

References

Further reading

External links
Shotley Bridge Directory Map and local information
Shotley Bridge Conservation Area

Villages in County Durham
Consett